The 2009 Chicago Fire season was the club's 14th year of existence, as well as their 12th season in Major League Soccer and 12th consecutive year in the top-flight of American soccer. It began with a 3-1 away win over FC Dallas on March 21, 2009 and ended with a loss on penalties to Real Salt Lake in the Eastern Conference Final on November 14, 2009.

Current roster

Squad

As of July 17, 2009. 

 (Captain)

Transfers

In

Out

Club

Management

Other information

Statistics

Competitions

Overall

Standings

Results summary

Matches

MLS regular season

March

April

May

June

July

August

September

October

MLS playoffs

SuperLiga 2009

U.S. Open Cup

Friendlies

References

External links 
2009 Schedule

2009
Chicago Fire
Chicago Fire
Chicago Fire